Brăești is a commune in Buzău County, Muntenia, Romania. It is composed of seven villages: Brăești, Brătilești, Goidești, Ivănețu, Pinu, Pârscovelu and Ruginoasa.

The commune is traversed by the river Bălăneasa. Brăești borders the following communes: Chiliile to the east, Odăile to the south, Bozioru to the south-west, Gura Teghii to the north-west, and Lopătari to the north-east.

Notes

Communes in Buzău County
Localities in Muntenia